Desmond or Desmond's may refer to:

Arts and entertainment
 Desmond (novel), 1792 novel by Charlotte Turner Smith
 Desmond's, 1990s British television sitcom

Ireland
 Kingdom of Desmond, medieval Irish kingdom
 Earl of Desmond, Irish aristocratic title
 Desmond Rebellions, Irish rebellions during the 16th century led by the Earl of Desmond

Science and technology
 DESMOND (diabetes) (Diabetes Education and Self Management for Ongoing and Newly Diagnosed), a UK NHS diabetes education programme
 Desmond (software), molecular dynamics simulation software
 Storm Desmond, a windstorm in Britain and Ireland in 2015

Other uses
 Desmond (name), a common given name and surname
 Desmond (horse) (1896-1913), Thoroughbred racehorse
 Desmond's (department store), a former US store
 Desmond, slang term for the British 2:2 degree classification

See also
 Desman, a tribe of aquatic mammals
 Clíodhna, principal goddess of Desmond, or South Munster
 Limerick Desmond League, an association football league in west County Limerick